John-Henry Butterworth is an English screenwriter who has co-written several screenplays with his brother Jez Butterworth. The brothers won the Writers Guild of America's 2011 Paul Selvin Award for their screenplay for the film Fair Game (2010).

Filmography

Film

Television

References

External links

1976 births
English male screenwriters
English screenwriters
Living people